Herpothallon subglobosum is a species of corticolous (bark-dwelling), crustose lichen in the family Arthoniaceae. Found in China, it was formally described as a new species in 2022 by Pengfei Chen and Lulu Zhang. The lichen contains gyrophoric acid, lecanoric acid, and umbilicaric acid, which are lichen products that can be detected using thin-layer chromatography. The species epithet  subglobosum refers to the somewhat spherical pseudisidia.

References

Arthoniomycetes
Lichen species
Lichens described in 2022
Lichens of China